List of ships built by Aberdeen shipbuilders Hall, Russell & Company, from yard number 301 to 400.

The ships built in the sequence 301 to 400 cover the period 1896 — 1906. The majority of vessels built during this period were fishing vessels for British owners, with a smaller number of cargo vessels for British and overseas owners.

Notes
 Where available, vessel measurements taken from Lloyd's Register, giving registered length, beam and draft. Hall, Russell and Company's own measurements typically are length overall, beam and moulded depth.
 Rubislaw used on two distinct vessels at the same time - one a fishing vessel, the other a cargo vessel.
 Yard Number 399 not used.

References

Ships built in Scotland